Mr. Long is a 2017 internationally co-produced crime drama film directed by Sabu. It was selected to compete for the Golden Bear in the main competition section of the 67th Berlin International Film Festival.

Cast
 Chang Chen as Long
 Sho Aoyagi as Kenji
 Yao Yiti as Lily
 Bai Runyin as Jun
 Masashi Arifuku as Heisuke
 Taro Suwa as Tadao
 Ritsuko Okusa as Kumiko
 Shiiko Utagawa as Machiko
 Yusuke Fukuchi as Jiang
 Tetsuya Chiba as Sakata

References

External links
  
 

2017 films
2017 drama films
Japanese crime drama films
Chinese crime drama films
Taiwanese crime drama films
German crime drama films
2010s Japanese films
2010s German films